Smallanthus fruticosus is a species of shrub in the family Asteraceae. It is native to the Andes (from Colombia to Bolivia).

S. fruticosus contains the cytotoxic flavone centaureidin and the flavanone sakuranetin.

References

fruticosus
Flora of Ecuador
Flora of Peru
Flora of Colombia
Flora of Bolivia